Stenocrepis elegans is a species of beetle in the family Carabidae. It is found on Cuba and Bahamas as well as in Mexico and the United States.

References

Further reading

Harpalinae
Beetles described in 1835
Taxa named by Louis Alexandre Auguste Chevrolat